A list of films produced in France in 1938:

See also
 1938 in France

References

External links
 French films of 1938 at the Internet Movie Database
French films of 1938 at Cinema-francais.fr

1938
Films
French